Garbaharey District is a district in the southwestern Gedo region of Somalia. Its capital is Garbaharey.

It is mainly populated by the Reer Amir Nuur subclan of the Marehan Tribe. It was also the base used by Siad Barre, the former President of Somalia after he was expelled from Mogadishu in January 1991. There is a stream that runs on the edge of the town that fills in the rainy season and sometimes cuts off transport entering then exiting the town city.

References

External links
 Districts of Somalia
 Administrative map of Garbaharey District

Districts of Somalia

Gedo